Hatboro station is a rail station on SEPTA Regional Rail's  Warminster Line, formerly the Reading Railroad's New Hope Branch, in Hatboro, Pennsylvania and once terminus for electrified MUs. Electrification was extended to Warminster in 1974. Current trains stopping at Hatboro station are the SEPTA Silverliner IV and the SEPTA Silverliner V. The station is located at the intersection of Byberry Road and Penn Street.  The station features a passing siding for handling multiple trains as well as a 100-space parking lot. The current brick construction station stands at 20' x 55' and was built in 1935. An original wood construction freight station was completed in 1871 but no longer stands at the site.

Description

Hatboro station consists of a side platform along the tracks. The station has a ticket office and waiting room that is open on weekday mornings. Hatboro station has a parking lot with 100 spaces, with a remote parking area across Byberry Road that contains 75 spaces. Both parking lots charge $1 a day. Parking is also provided at the Hatboro Municipal Parking Lot across Moreland Avenue, which has 93 spaces and charges $1 a day.

Train service at Hatboro station is provided along the Warminster Line of SEPTA Regional Rail, which runs south to Center City Philadelphia and north one stop to its terminus at Warminster. Hatboro station is located in fare zone 3. Service is provided daily from early morning to late evening. Most Warminster Line trains continue through the Center City Commuter Connection tunnel and become Airport Line trains, providing service to the Philadelphia International Airport. In FY 2013, Hatboro station had a weekday average of 457 boardings and 430 alightings.

Station layout

References 
Reading Railroad History site

External links

 SEPTA – Hatboro Station
 Station from Moreland Avenue from Google Maps Street View

SEPTA Regional Rail stations
Stations on the Warminster Line
Former Reading Company stations
Railway stations in the United States opened in 1871
Railway stations in Montgomery County, Pennsylvania